Mark Anthony Delaney (born 13 May 1976) is a Welsh former professional footballer. He played for Carmarthen Town, Cardiff City and Aston Villa as a right back. He is also a former member of the Welsh national team, gaining 36 caps during his career. In doing so, he became the first player to progress from the Cymru Premier to the senior national side.

Early life
Delaney was raised in Goodwick, Pembrokeshire by his parents Mike and Angelina. He is of Italian descent, with his maternal grandparents having moved to Wales after World War II. He attended Ysgol Bro Gwaun (located in Fishguard). He is a fluent Welsh speaker.

Club career
As a youngster, Delaney played in the youth system at Manchester United but was released after he was deemed too small. After playing for local amateur side Goodwick United, Delaney joined League of Wales side Carmarthen Town in 1996, later becoming club captain at 20 years of age. He was spotted by Cardiff City manager Frank Burrows and joined the club on 1 June 1998 on a free transfer. He made 40 appearances in all competitions for Cardiff, scoring once in the FA Cup against Chester City on 14 November 1998, between his purchase and his sale to Aston Villa eight months later on 9 March 1999 for £500,000. Delaney had been travelling to an away match with Cardiff against Brighton & Hove Albion when he was informed of the transfer by manager Frank Burrows on their arrival.

Aston Villa

The day after his transfer was completed, Delaney's father drove him to Birmingham and he travelled with the first-team for their match against Derby County. One month later, Delaney was handed his Premier League debut by manager John Gregory, replacing Steve Stone in the final ten minutes of a 3–1 victory over Nottingham Forest on 24 April 1999. He made just one further appearance for the club during the final matches of the 1998–99 season, during a 1–0 defeat to Arsenal. After a full pre-season with Villa, Gregory promoted Delaney to first choice right-back ahead of Steve Watson at the start of the following season. Delaney credits Gregory with improving his performances during his early career with Villa, Gregory singling out Delaney during his seventh appearance for the side, describing him as "playing like a tart" during the half-time team talk. Delaney went on to score the only goal of the game in the second half of the match as his side defeated Watford 1–0.

During his first season at Villa Park, the club finished in sixth place in the league, reached the semi-final of the League Cup and the final of the FA Cup, Delaney playing the full match as Villa lost 1–0 to Chelsea. He made 193 first appearances for Aston Villa in all competitions, with two goals coming against Watford on 24 August 1999 and Everton on 26 December 2005. He has also gained 36 international caps with the Wales national team.

Delaney's Aston Villa career was tempered with knee injuries, which he attributes to his willingness to fly into tackles as a youngster hoping to impress. Delaney travelled to see noted American knee specialist Richard Steadman in an attempt to end the injuries, but was informed by the surgeon that it was unlikely that Delaney would return to playing football following extensive surgery. Delaney was out of contract at Aston Villa in summer 2007 and was hoping to impress Martin O'Neill enough to win a new contract. However, on 15 August 2007, he announced his retirement from football due to the above injury problems.

Coaching career 
On 5 September 2007, Delaney stated he is hoping to go into coaching, and in 2008, Delaney re-joined Aston Villa as a youth coach. In 2015, Delaney was named head coach of the Aston Villa F.C. Under-23s squad.

On 8 January 2021, Aston Villa were forced to name a squad full of academy players for an FA Cup third round tie against Liverpool due to a COVID-19 outbreak at Villa's Bodymoor Heath Training Ground. First team coach Dean Smith was unable to attend as he had to self-isolate, so Delaney acted as first team coach for that game. Aston Villa lost the game 4–1, but were praised for the performance of their young, inexperienced side.

On 20 May 2022, it was announced that Delaney had left Aston Villa, after 14 years at the club in various coaching roles.

Career statistics

Honours
Aston Villa
UEFA Intertoto Cup: 2001

Individual
PFA Team of the Year: 1998–99 Third Division

References

External links

1976 births
Living people
Welsh people of Irish descent
Welsh footballers
Association football fullbacks
Carmarthen Town A.F.C. players
Aston Villa F.C. players
Cardiff City F.C. players
Cymru Premier players
English Football League players
Premier League players
Wales international footballers
Sportspeople from Haverfordwest
Welsh people of Italian descent
FA Cup Final players
Aston Villa F.C. non-playing staff
Association football coaches